Oee may refer to:
Oee (Attica), a town of ancient Attica, Greece
Overall equipment effectiveness